Tangled Skeins is a 1916 short silent film drama directed by E. Mason Hopper. It was released by the Mutual Film Company.

This film is preserved in the Library of Congress collection(Packard Campus is part of the Library of Congress system).

Cast
Gayne Whitman - Randall Wellington (*billed Alfred Vosburgh)
Vivian Rich - Laura Doone
Beverly Juneau - Countess Isabel
Louise Lester - Mrs. Wellington
Emma Kluge - Mrs. Rodney
George Periolat - Carl Curtis
Harry McCabe -

References

External links

1916 films
American silent short films
Films directed by E. Mason Hopper
American black-and-white films
Silent American drama films
1916 drama films
1910s American films